Capendu is a commune in the Aude department in southern France.

Etymology 
Mentioned in the form Campendud 1071. Occitan “sloping field”, “inclined field”. Fortuitous homophony with Capendu, hamlet of Blainville-Crevon (Seine-Maritime) which means “hung cat”. Armorial bearings

History 
One finds potteries dating about 20.000 years ago in the Mayrac locality. The traces reveal a Roman camp site near the placement of the windmill of Roque Del Die (Occitan for Rock of God).

Population

Events
For seven years, FestiVoix, organized by the community of communes, has invited choral societies and artists.

See also
 Corbières AOC
 Communes of the Aude department

References

Communes of Aude
Aude communes articles needing translation from French Wikipedia